Hans-Peter Reinecke (1941–2005) was a German actor.

Partial filmography
Spotkania w mroku (1960) - 1. Angeklagter
Holubice (1960) - Ulli
Das hölzerne Kälbchen (1960) - Hirte
Beschreibung eines Sommers (1963) - Tenser
Julia lebt (1963) - Zatopek
Christine (1963)
Der fliegende Holländer (1964) - Steuermann
Trace of Stones (1966) - Galonski
Unterwegs zu Lenin (1969) - Kleiner Soldat
KLK Calling PTZ – The Red Orchestra (1971) - Karl Winkler
Nakovalnya ili chuk (1972) - Van der Lube
Der Untergang der Emma (1974) - Mischas Vater
Zum Beispiel Josef (1974) - Bruno
Jacob the Liar (1974) - Soldat vor Latrine
Punane viiul (1975) - Brückner
Requiem für Hans Grundig (1976)
Die Moral der Banditen (1976) - Bürgermeister Sandberg
Tambari (1977) - Heinrich Töller
Wer reißt denn gleich vor’m Teufel aus (1977) - Räuberhauptmann
Taubenjule (1983) - Klaus Kürbs

1941 births
2005 deaths
German male television actors
German male stage actors
German male film actors
Actors from Magdeburg